Route 403 is a minor highway in the western region of Newfoundland in the Canadian province of Newfoundland and Labrador.  The highway begins at a junction with the Trans-Canada Highway (Route 1)  and continues to its northern terminus, the community of Journois.

Route description

Route 403 begins at an intersection with Route 1 (Trans-Canada Highway) along the banks of Flat Bay Brook. It heads west paralleling the brook to pass through Joyce, where it makes a sharp right turn to the north to enter Flat Bay, where it makes a left turn as it passes through town. The highway now heads southwest along the coastline to pass through Flat Bay West and St. Teresa before coming to a dead end in Journois.

Major intersections

References

403